Brent H. Goodfellow (born 1940) is an American politician and educator from Utah.

He is a Democrat, and a former member of the Utah State Senate, representing the state's 12th senate district in Salt Lake and Tooele Counties.

Goodfellow is an alumnus of the University of Utah.

References
 House of Representatives. State of Utah (archive.org)

1940 births
Living people
Democratic Party Utah state senators
People from West Valley City, Utah
University of Utah alumni
21st-century American politicians